The Taylor J-2 Cub (later also known as the Piper J-2 Cub) is an American two-seat light aircraft that was designed and built by the Taylor Aircraft Company. The company became the Piper Aircraft Company and the J-2 was first of a long line of related Piper Cub designs.

Development

The J-2 Cub was a development of the earlier Taylor Cub. In 1935 the Taylor Aircraft Company had decided to improve their Cub line of aircraft which were angular and austere-looking and initially had an unglazed cabin area.

The new J-2 had rounded-off wing tips, a similarly "rounded" fin and rudder framed up and fabric-covered separately from the fuselage structure, enclosed cabin and wider Goodyear "airwheel" tires, a special low-pressure variety of aircraft landing gear tire pioneered by Alvin Musselmann  in 1929 that resembled a later tundra tire in general appearance and proportions. Powered by a 37 hp Continental A-40-3 piston engine the aircraft appeared in October 1935 and the type certificate was issued on 14 February 1936. From September 1936 the engine was changed to a 40 hp Continental A-40-4. One sub-type was produced, the J-2S which was a float-equipped version.

In 1935 Clarence Gilbert Taylor left the company to start another aircraft manufacturer which would become Taylorcraft. William T. Piper bought Taylor's shares in the company. In 1936 and 1937 some aircraft were completed by Aircraft Associates in California and these were known as the Western Cub.

In 1937 the original Piper factory, a renovated former silk mill in Bradford, PA, was destroyed by fire and the company moved to Lock Haven, PA and production restarted in May 1937 and the company was renamed the Piper Aircraft Corporation in November 1937.

Production and operational use

The last of 1,207 J-2s was completed in 1938 as production of the J-3 Cub started. Numbers of J-2 Cubs were exported to Europe including to the United Kingdom. The type was mainly flown by private pilot owners.

Over 100 Taylor and Piper J-2s remained on the U.S. civil aircraft register in 2009.

Variants
 Dudek V-1 Sportplane a low-wing homebuilt based on the J-2.

Specifications (J-2 Cub)

References

 Roger W. Peperell and Colin M.Smith, Piper Aircraft and their forerunners, 1987, Air-Britain (Historians), Page 18 to 22.
 "Specifications of American Airplanes". Aviation, March 1936, Vol. 35, No. 3. pp. 82–85. Registration required.

Cub, J-2
1930s United States civil utility aircraft
Single-engined tractor aircraft
High-wing aircraft
Aircraft first flown in 1935